Psychopsis is a genus of four known species of orchids native to northern South America, Central America and Trinidad.  The genus name is abbreviated Pyp. in the horticultural trade.

Description
Psychopsis are epiphytic orchids with laterally crushed cylindrical pseudobulbs from which two fleshy coriaceous leaves appear apically, in their center two floral wands emerge with large golden yellow flowers with purple spots on bands in sepals and on the lip whose edges are forming folds.

Psychopsis very often  grows on the trunks and branches of trees. The flowers look like large butterflies with brightly colored bodies (the lip, a modified petal), very long antennae-like petals, and outspread wing-like dappled yellow and brown sepals.

The butterfly orchid is rumored to have started the European "Orchidmania" of the 19th century.

Taxonomy
Psychopsis was formerly included in the massively paraphyletic "wastebin genus" Oncidium within the section Glanduligera, named after the genus's distinctive oil-secreting glands.  Orchids in this genus are commonly called butterfly orchids, but some species of other orchid genera are also called thus. The species Psychopsiella limminghei was once included in Psychopsis but is now accepted as its own monotypic genus.

Species
Species currently accepted as of October 2020:

References

External links
 
 

Oncidiinae genera
Oncidiinae
Taxa named by Constantine Samuel Rafinesque